The Atlanta Gay Center was a community center that served the gay community in Atlanta, Georgia (United States). It was founded in 1976. It has since closed and been replaced by the Atlanta Gay and Lesbian Community Center.

The center published a bi-weekly newspaper, and operated the Gay Helpline for the Atlanta area.  The center was the meeting place for several support groups including those for teens, interracial couples, older couples, and P-FLAG.

During the early 1980s, in the early days of HIV/AIDS awareness, the Atlanta Gay Center offered free testing and support groups.

See also

List of LGBT community centers

References

External links
 GLTBQ encyclopedia: Atlanta — includes LGBT history in Atlanta

Former LGBT community centres
LGBT history in Georgia (U.S. state)
LGBT culture in Atlanta
1976 in LGBT history
1976 establishments in Georgia (U.S. state)
Organizations established in 1976